"Ruby" is a song by English indie rock band Kaiser Chiefs. It was released in the United Kingdom on 5 February 2007 as the lead single from their second studio album, Yours Truly, Angry Mob (2007). It became the band's first British number-one single on 25 February 2007 and ended 2007 as the year's 10th-biggest-selling single in the UK, with total sales of 313,765. As of September 2016, it has sold over 600,000 copies in the UK as stated by the British Phonographic Industry. "Ruby" was voted number 13 on the Triple J Hottest 100 of 2007, Australia's largest annual music poll.

A video single of the song was released in the United States at Best Buy stores on 13 March 2007, two weeks before the album was released there, and featured a live version of "Everything Is Average Nowadays" and the B-side "Admire You" (released on the UK 7-inch version).

Speaking about the song lead singer Ricky Wilson said about Ruby "she is super cool, totally unapproachable” and that “there was a girl like that at school”. In an interview with contactmusic.com guitarist Andrew White said “it’s not really about anyone” and “if you know someone called Ruby, it’s about them”. In a 2022 TikTok video, Nick Hodgson later revealed that Ruby was his family pet, a black Labrador.

Music video
The promo for "Ruby" was directed by Swedish production company Stylewar, who also produced the 2005 video for "I Predict a Riot", and features the band performing in a desert landscape whilst a CGI metropolis-like miniature city builds around them. The video was scheduled to be shown on Channel 4 at 11:35 p.m. on 15 January 2007 but was pulled from the schedules for unknown reasons. The video finally premiered on the official Kaiser Chiefs website four days later.

Track listings

 UK 7-inch ruby-red vinyl single 
A. "Ruby"
B. "Admire You"

 UK and Irish CD single, digital download 
 "Ruby" – 3:24
 "From the Neck Down" – 2:29

 Best Buy video single 
 "Everything Is Average Nowadays" (live)
 "Admire You"
 "Ruby" (video)

 European enhanced CD single 
 "Ruby"
 "From the Neck Down"
 "Admire You"
 "Ruby" (video)

Charts and certifications

Weekly charts

Year-end charts

Certifications

Notable cover versions
On 19 January 2011, Italian band Elio e le Storie Tese played a cover version of the song at the nationwide TV-show Parla con Me, with lyrics changed into a satiric reference to the  Rubygate sex scandal, which then Italian Prime Minister Silvio Berlusconi had just been involved with.

References

Kaiser Chiefs songs
2006 songs
2007 singles
B-Unique Records singles
British power pop songs
European Hot 100 Singles number-one singles
Number-one singles in the Czech Republic
Number-one singles in Scotland
Polydor Records singles
Song recordings produced by Stephen Street
Songs written by Andrew White (musician)
Songs written by Nick "Peanut" Baines
Songs written by Nick Hodgson
Songs written by Ricky Wilson (British musician)
Songs written by Simon Rix
UK Singles Chart number-one singles
Universal Motown Records singles